Yatin is a given name. Notable people with the name include:

Yatin Karyekar (born 1946), Indian film actor
Yatin Patel, American photographer and artist

See also
Yatina, town and locality in the Australian state of South Australia